The Miracle Child (French: L'enfant du miracle) is a 1932 French science fiction film based on a play of the same name by Robert Charvay and Paul Gavault. The plot of the film centers around a widow named Blanche Montel who endeavours to find a man with whom to produce a child so that she can pretend that the child was her late husband's and so inherit a fortune. In a scene which has been cited as particularly humorous, a few characters interrupt a Spiritualist séance and are subsequently believed to be ghosts. Ginette Leclerc's minor role in The Miracle Child was one of her first acting roles in a long and successful career.

References

1932 films
French black-and-white films
French films based on plays
French science fiction drama films
1930s science fiction drama films
1932 drama films
1930s French films
1930s French-language films